The 1987 World Table Tennis Championships women's doubles was the 38th edition of the women's doubles championship.
Hyun Jung-hwa and Yang Young-ja defeated Dai Lili and Li Huifen in the final by two sets to one.

Results

See also
 List of World Table Tennis Championships medalists

References

-
1987 in women's table tennis